The shining bronze cuckoo (Chrysococcyx lucidus) is a species of cuckoo in the family Cuculidae, found in Australia, Indonesia, New Caledonia, New Zealand, Papua New Guinea, Solomon Islands, and Vanuatu. It was previously also known as Chalcites lucidus.

It is a very small cuckoo, being only  in length, and parasitises chiefly dome-shaped nests of various Gerygone species, having a range that largely corresponds with the distribution of that genus. It may also parasitise other Acanthizidae species, and is also the most southerly ranging brood parasitic bird species in the world, extending to at least 46°S in New Zealand.

Taxonomy

The shining bronze cuckoo was formally described in 1788 by the German naturalist Johann Friedrich Gmelin in his revised and expanded edition of Carl Linnaeus's Systema Naturae. He placed it with all the other cuckoos in the genus Cuculus and coined the binomial name Cuculus lucidus. Gmelin based his description on the Shining cuckoo from New Zealand that had been described and illustrated in 1782 by the English ornithologist John Latham in his A General Synopsis of Birds. Latham had in turn based his account on a drawing obtained from Joseph Banks. The shining bronze cuckoo is now placed together with 12 other species in the genus Chrysococcyx that was introduced in 1826 by the German zoologist Friedrich Boie. The genus name combines the Ancient Greek χρυσος khrusos meaning "gold" with κοκκυξ kokkux "cuckoo". The specific epithet lucidus is from Latin and means "clear" or "bright".

In 1801 Latham described the "Glossy cuckoo" as Cuculus plagosus from New South Wales, and the two were classified as separate species for many years. However Latham's Cuculus plagosus is now considered as a subspecies of the shining bronze cuckoo. In New Zealand it is usually known as the shining cuckoo, or by its Māori name .

Formerly some authorities placed the shining bronze cuckoo in the genus Chalcites instead of Chrysococcyx.

Four subspecies are recognised:
 C. l. harterti (Mayr, 1932) – resident on Rennell and Bellona (south Solomon Islands) 
 C. l. layardi Mathews, 1912 – resident on Temotu (=Santa Cruz Islands, southeast Solomon Islands), Vanuatu including Banks Islands and New Caledonia including Loyalty Islands 
 C. l. plagosus (Latham, 1801) – breeds southwest Western Australia, Cape York Peninsula, northeast Queensland to southeast South Australia and Tasmania (southwest, northeast Australia and Tasmania): winters Lesser Sunda Islands, New Guinea and Bismarck Archipelago
 C. l. lucidus (Gmelin, JF, 1788) – breeds North, South, Stewart Island, satellites and Chatham Islands (east of South Island; New Zealand): winters to east Australia, New Guinea, D'Entrecasteaux Archipelago (east of southeast New Guinea), Bismarck Archipelago including Admiralty Islands and Solomon Islands

Description
It is slightly larger than Horsfield's bronze cuckoo (Chrysococcyx basalis). It has metallic golden or coppery green upperparts and white cheeks and underparts barred with dark green. The female is similar with a more purplish sheen to the crown and nape and bronzer-tinged barring on the belly. The bill is black and the feet are black with yellow undersides.

Distribution and habitat

The shining bronze cuckoo is a summer visitor to Eastern Australia from the Cape York Peninsula in Queensland to South Australia's Eyre Peninsula and Kangaroo Island and Tasmania, as well as Western Australia from Carnarvon in the north to the southwest and east to Esperance. These winter in the Lessa Sunda Islands and New Guinea. New Zealand populations winter in the Solomon Islands and arrive in New Zealand from mid August, though they are not common until October. They spread out to Stewart and Chatham Islands and are found to an altitude of 4000 ft. The island races, layardi in New Caledonia, Vanuatu and some of the islands of the Solomon Islands,  and harterti of Rennell and Bellona Islands in the Solomons, are non-migratory.

Behaviour and ecology

Breeding

A female shining bronze cuckoo lays a single egg in a host nest and removes a host egg.  After hatching, the baby cuckoo ejects the host nestlings from the nest.

The grey warbler is a common host species in New Zealand, the shining bronze cuckoos missing the first but parasitising heavily the second broods of the season (55% of nests in a study in Kaikoura). Fieldwork near Kaikoura showed that the dark colour of cuckoo eggs seemed to serve to protect cuckoo eggs from being removed by other cuckoos in grey warbler nests rather than the hosts. A test using model eggs of different tones showed that the hosts did not reject eggs, but that cuckoos removed eggs of brighter colours. The dark matte cuckoo eggs are hard to see in the shadows of a grey warbler nest.

The Chatham Island warbler is a host species in the Chatham Islands. The matte eggs laid are olive brown in Western Australia and various shades of green or greenish white to olive to dark brown elsewhere, and do not resemble the eggs of their host. The dark pigment rubs off easily. The eggs are often dark coloured in thornbill and gerygone nests, whose eggs are likewise domed and dark. This is thought to minimise the risk of ejection by a second female cuckoo visitor to the already parasitised nest, which might overlook a dark egg when laying another egg.

Several other species are occasional hosts. In Victoria in 2005, a pair of chestnut-rumped heathwren was encountered with a juvenile shining bronze cuckoo which imitated the alarm call of a baby heathwren. The introduced house sparrow and song thrush have been recorded as hosts in New Zealand.

In New Caledonia, the fan-tailed gerygone (Gerygone flavolateralis) is the sole host of the species.

Food and feeding
Insectivorous, the shining bronze cuckoo eats insects that are avoided by other birds, such as caterpillars, particularly those of the magpie moth, and beetles, particularly ladybirds. The shining bronze cuckoo's gizzard is lined with a soft thick lining which catches the caterpillar spines; these fall away and are spat out by the bird.

Predators and threats
The shining bronze cuckoo falls prey to cats.  It has been recorded dying after flying into windows.

References

Sources

External links 
 Aviceda Wildlife Services Global Bird Image gallery
 On the HBW Internet Bird Collection

shining bronze cuckoo
Birds of Oceania
shining bronze cuckoo
shining bronze cuckoo
Taxonomy articles created by Polbot
Taxobox binomials not recognized by IUCN